The Polaris Skin is an Italian ultralight trike, that was designed and produced by Polaris Motor of Gubbio. The aircraft was supplied as a complete ready-to-fly-aircraft.

By 2014 the company website was listed as "under construction", then was taken down and the company went out of business.

Design and development
It features a cable-braced hang glider-style high-wing, weight-shift controls, a two-seats-in-tandem open cockpit with an optional cockpit fairing, tricycle landing gear with wheel pants and a single engine in pusher configuration.

The aircraft is made from steel and bolted-together aluminum tubing, with its double surface wing covered in Dacron sailcloth. Its  span wing is supported by a single tube-type kingpost and uses an "A" frame weight-shift control bar. The powerplant is a twin cylinder, air-cooled, two-stroke, dual-ignition  Rotax 503 or the liquid-cooled  Rotax 582 engine.

A number of different wings can be fitted to the basic carriage, including the Gryps 14, Gyps 16, Gyps 19 and the Ares 21.

Specifications (Skin with Gyps 16 wing)

References

External links

1980s Italian sport aircraft
1980s Italian ultralight aircraft
Homebuilt aircraft
Single-engined pusher aircraft
Ultralight trikes